VA-209 was a short-lived Attack Squadron of the U.S. Naval Reserve. It was established on 1 July 1970 as part of a reorganization intended to increase the combat readiness of the Naval Air Reserve Force. It was based at Naval Air Station Glenview, Illinois, and flew A-4L Skyhawk aircraft. The squadron was disestablished after one year's service, on 15 August 1971, being replaced by the addition of two fighter squadrons to Reserve Air Wing 20.

See also
 List of squadrons in the Dictionary of American Naval Aviation Squadrons
 Attack aircraft
 List of inactive United States Navy aircraft squadrons
 History of the United States Navy

References

Attack squadrons of the United States Navy
Wikipedia articles incorporating text from the Dictionary of American Naval Aviation Squadrons